Final Jeopardy may refer to:

 Final Jeopardy!, a round in the TV game show Jeopardy!
 Final Jeopardy (1985 film), the 1985 TV film starring Richard Thomas and Mary Crosby
 Final Jeopardy (2001 film), the 2001 TV film starring Dana Delany and Billy Burke
 Final Jeopardy, a novel by Linda Fairstein

See also

 
 Jeopardy (disambiguation)
 Final (disambiguation)